Typhloreicheia is a genus of beetles in the family Carabidae, containing the following species:

 Typhloreicheia abbazzii Magrini & Fancello, 2007
 Typhloreicheia andreinii (Dodero, 1916)
 Typhloreicheia angelae Magrini, 2003
 Typhloreicheia annamariae Magrini, 2003
 Typhloreicheia arganoi Vigna Taglianti, 2001
 Typhloreicheia bastianinii Magrini, 2003
 Typhloreicheia berninii Magrini, Bastianini & Petrioli, 2001
 Typhloreicheia cirocchii Magrini, 2003
 Typhloreicheia consortii Magrini, 2003
 Typhloreicheia damone (Holdhaus, 1924)
 Typhloreicheia degiovannii Magrini, 2003
 Typhloreicheia denticulata (Holdhaus, 1924)
 Typhloreicheia doderoi (Holdhaus, 1924)
 Typhloreicheia elegans (Dodero, 1916)
 Typhloreicheia eleonorae Leo, Magrini & Fancello, 2005
 Typhloreicheia exilis Leo, Magrini & Fancello, 2005
 Typhloreicheia fancelloi Magrini, 1999
 Typhloreicheia fausti Fancello, 1988
 Typhloreicheia henroti Jeannel, 1957
 Typhloreicheia holdhausi Magrini, Fancello & Casale, 2006
 Typhloreicheia ilianae Casale & Marcia, 2011
 Typhloreicheia ilvensis (Holdhaus, 1924)
 Typhloreicheia jana Magrini, Fancello & Casale, 2006
 Typhloreicheia jucunda (Holdhaus, 1924)
 Typhloreicheia kraussei (Reitter, 1914)
 Typhloreicheia laurentii Magrini, 2004
 Typhloreicheia leoi Magrini, 2003
 Typhloreicheia maginii Magrini & Vanni, 1990
 Typhloreicheia manto (Holdhaus, 1924)
 Typhloreicheia martanensis Magrini & Degiovanni, 2007
 Typhloreicheia medusa Magrini & Fancello, 2005
 Typhloreicheia melonii Magrini, 2000
 Typhloreicheia messanae Magrini, 2007
 Typhloreicheia mingazzinii Magrini & Vanni, 1990
 Typhloreicheia minima Binaghi, 1936
 Typhloreicheia monacha Casale & Marcia, 2011
 Typhloreicheia monticola (Holdhaus, 1924)
 Typhloreicheia montisneronis Binaghi, 1942
 Typhloreicheia nadiae Magrini, 2003
 Typhloreicheia occulta (Holdhaus, 1924)
 Typhloreicheia onnisi Casale & Magrini, 2004
 Typhloreicheia pandora (Holdhaus, 1924)
 Typhloreicheia parallela (Holdhaus, 1924)
 Typhloreicheia pellita Leo, Magrini & Fancello, 2005
 Typhloreicheia petriolii Magrini & Fancello, 2007
 Typhloreicheia praecox (Schaum, 1857)
 Typhloreicheia raymondi (Putzeys, 1869)
 Typhloreicheia regina Leo, Magrini & Fancello, 2005
 Typhloreicheia rocchii Magrini & Degiovanni, 2006
 Typhloreicheia sardoa (Baudi, 1891)
 Typhloreicheia supramontis Leo, Magrini & Fancello, 2005
 Typhloreicheia tanit Leo, Magrini & Fancello, 2005
 Typhloreicheia tegulae Leo, Magrini & Fancello, 2005
 Typhloreicheia usslaubi (Saulcy, 1870)
 Typhloreicheia valeriae Fancello, 1988
 Typhloreicheia vignai Magrini, 2003
 Typhloreicheia viti Magrini & Bulirsch, 2002
 Typhloreicheia zingarensis Magrini & Baviera, 2003

References

Scaritinae